The Kamar or Kamara is an Indian caste found in the Odisha states of India. They are similar to Karmakar caste of Bengal. Historically, they were blacksmiths by profession, commonly forging agricultural equipments like: sickles, axes, spades, crowbars etc.

Social Status
In the state of Odisha, The Kamaras are included in the Other Backward Classes minority group.

Reference

Social groups of Odisha
Indian castes